is a Japanese manga series about hearing disability, written and illustrated by Kōji Yoshimoto. It was serialized in Shogakukan's seinen manga magazine Big Comic Superior from January 2016 to September 2017, with its chapters collected in three tankōbon volumes.

Publication
Shogakukan collected its chapters in three tankōbon volumes released from May 30, 2016, to September 29, 2017.

Volume list

Reception
The series ranked first in the July 2016 edition of Takarajimasha's Kono Manga ga Sugoi! Web. Sabishii no wa Anta dake ja Nai was one of the Jury Recommended Works at the 20th Japan Media Arts Festival in 2017.

References

Further reading

External links
 

Autobiographical anime and manga
Literature about deaf people
Non-fiction comics
Seinen manga
Shogakukan manga